Sink or Swim may refer to:

Music 
 Sink or Swim (The Gaslight Anthem album)
 Sink or Swim (Over My Dead Body album)
 Sink or Swim (The Waifs album)
 "Sink or Swim" (song), a song by Bad Lieutenant
 "Sink or Swim", a song by Chicosci from Revenge of the Giant Robot
 "Sink or Swim", a song by Falling In Reverse from The Drug in Me Is You

Television 
 Sink or Swim (TV series), a British television sitcom 
 "Sink or Swim" (CSI: Miami), an episode of CSI: Miami
 "Sink or Swim", an episode of Kim Possible
 "Sink or Swim", an episode of The Suite Life of Zack & Cody
 "Sink or Swim", an episode of the British sitcom Odd Man Out

Other media 
 Sink or Swim (video game), a 1993 game also known as S.S. Lucifer: Man Overboard!
 Sink or Swim; or, Harry Raymond's Resolve, a novel by Horatio Alger, Jr.
 Sink or Swim (1920 film) a 1920 film directed by Richard Stanton
 Sink or Swim (1963 film) a 1963 Japanese film directed by Yuzo Kawashima
 Sink or Swim (1990 film), a 1990 film by Su Friedrich
 Sink or Swim (2018 film), a 2018 French film